Eduard von Borsody (13 June 1898 – 1 January 1970) was an Austrian cameraman, film editor, film director, and screenplay writer.

Biography
His film career began as a cameraman. Among his first jobs were three films on which Mihály Kertész (later Michael Curtiz) carried out the production design for the Vienna-based Sascha-Film: an Arthur Schnitzler adaptation Der junge Medardus (1923), the romance Fiaker Nr. 13 and the artist's life Der goldene Schmetterling (both 1926). Later he worked with such different directors as Carl Wilhelm, Ernő Metzner, Gustav Ucicky and Max Nosseck.

After the switch to sound film he was engaged by the German industry leader Universum Film AG (Ufa) as a film editor (cutter). Eduard von Borsody thereafter often worked under Ucicky's direction and edited for him, among many other films, the National Socialist propaganda films Morgenrot and Flüchtlinge. In 1937, after some experience as assistant director, also with Ucicky, and a series of short dramas, he directed his first film for Ufa: Brillanten ("Diamonds").   (1938), with René Deltgen and Gustav Diessl, was an adventure film about the real-life English explorer, Henry Wickham, who in 1876 smuggled rubber seeds to England in order to break Brazil's rubber monopoly. Sensationsprozeß Casilla (1939) was about a child abduction. With Kongo-Express (also in 1939) Borsody again shot an adventure film in a tropical setting in an attempt to capitalise on the success of Kautschuk. Willy Birgel, Marianne Hoppe and René Deltgen starred. 

Once World War II began, light cheerful escapist films were much in demand, and von Borsody was cinematographer for the romantic musical drama Wunschkonzert ("Request Concert"), one of the most successful films of the entire Nazi period. Ilse Werner plays a young Berliner, who patiently and trustingly awaits the return of the man to whom she is engaged, played by Carl Raddatz, ordered on a secret mission to Spain. The film was classified as "politically valuable", "artistically valuable", "valuable for the people". and "valuable for youth", and took 7.6 million Reichsmarks.

The science fiction film Weltraumschiff 18 (i.e. Spaceship 18), which he directed and had already begun filming had to be abandoned because of the outbreak of the war. Material was used in the short science-fiction movie, Weltraumschiff 1 startet (Spaceship 1 takes off). The last film Borsody shot before the end of the war, the Gottfried Keller adaptation Jugendliebe fell afoul of the film censors and did not open until 1947. After the end of the war Borsody had no trouble continuing his film career despite his previous involvement in propaganda films. After a number of Heimatfilme came his best-known post-war film, the romantic comedy of 1956 Dany, bitte schreiben Sie ("Dany, Please Write!"), with Sonja Ziemann and Rudolf Prack, and the smuggling film Liane, das Mädchen aus dem Urwald, with which he returned to the exotic. His next film, Skandal um Dodo (1958), was one of the first post-war films in German to star a black woman. 

His 1965 film Bergwind was entered into the 4th Moscow International Film Festival.

Family
Von Borsody was the father of actor Hans von Borsody. He was the younger brother of set designer Julius von Borsody. His granddaughter, Suzanne von Borsody, is a German actress.

Filmography

Silent films 
as cameraman if not indicated otherwise:
 Young Medardus (dir. Michael Curtiz, 1923) – camera (with Gustav Ucicky)
 Nameless (dir. Michael Curtiz, 1923) – camera (with Gustav Ucicky)
 Die vertauschte Braut (dir. Carl Wilhelm, 1925)
 Love Story (1925)
 Der Bastard (1925)
 Die Mühle von Sanssouci (1926) - camera assistant
 Fiaker Nr. 13 (1926) – camera (with Gustav Ucicky)
 Dürfen wir schweigen? (1926)
 The Third Squadron (dir. Carl Wilhelm, 1926) - camera (with Gustav Ucicky)
 Der goldene Schmetterling (1926) – camera (with Gustav Ucicky)
 Die Pratermizzi (dir. Gustav Ucicky, Karl Leiter, 1927)
 Tingel Tangel (dir. Gustav Ucicky, 1927)
 Höhere Töchter (1927)
 Polizeibericht Überfall (1928)
 It Attracted Three Fellows (dir. Carl Wilhelm, 1928)
 The Case of Prosecutor M (1928)
 Die Dame auf der Banknote (1929)
 The Call of the North (1929)
 The Missing Wife (1929)
 Liebeskleeblatt (1930)
 Die Jugendgeliebte/Goethe's Jugendgeliebte (1930)
 Rivals for the World Record (1930)
 Dance Into Happiness (1930)

Sound films to 1945 
 Yorck (dir. Gustav Ucicky, 1931) - assistant director, editor
 Two Hearts Beat as One (dir. Wilhelm Thiele, 1932)
 The Beautiful Adventure (dir. Reinhold Schünzel, 1932) - editor
 The Beautiful Adventure (dir. Reinhold Schünzel, Roger Le Bon, 1932) - editor
 Morgenrot (dir. Gustav Ucicky, 1933) - editor
 Season in Cairo (dir. Reinhold Schünzel, 1933)
 Refugees (dir. Gustav Ucicky, 1933) - assistant director, editor
 The Young Baron Neuhaus (dir. Gustav Ucicky, 1934) - editor
 Night in May (dir. Gustav Ucicky, Henri Chomette, Raoul Ploquin, 1934)
 Fresh Wind from Canada (dir. , 1935) - editor
 Joan of Arc (dir. Gustav Ucicky, 1935) - assistant director, editor
 Schnitzel fliegt (1935; drama short film) - director, screenplay
 The Last Four on Santa Cruz (dir. Werner Klingler, 1936) - editor
 Savoy Hotel 217 (dir. Gustav Ucicky, 1936) - editor
 Was ein Häkchen werden will (1936; drama short film) - director
 Stradivaris Schülergeige (1936; drama short film) - director
 Rosen und Liebe (1936; drama short film) - director
 Patentkunstschloss (1936; drama short film) - director
 In 40 Minuten (1936; drama short film) - director
 Die Hochzeitsreise (1936; drama short film) - director
 Früh übt sich (1936; drama short film) - director
 Du bist so schön, Berlinerin (1936; drama short film) - director
 The Man Who Was Sherlock Holmes (dir. Karl Hartl, 1937) - assistant director
 Jürgens riecht Lunte (1937; drama short film) - director, screenplay
 Diamonds (1937) - director
 Die Bombenidee (1937; drama short film) - director
 Kautschuk/Die Grüne Hölle (1938) - director, screenplay
 Sensationsprozess Casilla (1939) - director
 Congo Express (1939) - director, screenplay
 Wunschkonzert (1940) - director, screenplay
 Whom the Gods Love (dir. Karl Hartl, 1942) - screenplay

Post-war films 
 Jugendliebe/Übers Jahr, wenn die Kornblumen blühen (1944/47) - director
  (Austria 1948, with Brigitte Horney) - director, screenplay
 Arlberg Express (Austria 1948, with Paul Hubschmid and Elfe Gerhart) - director
 White Gold (Austria 1949, with Angela Salloker) - director, screenplay
 Wedding with Erika (West Germany 1950, with Marianne Schönauer and Wolfgang Lukschy) - director, screenplay
 Die Kreuzlschreiber (1950) - director, screenplay
 The Fourth Commandment (Austria 1950, with Attila Hörbiger) - director, screenplay
 Sensation in Savoy (West Germany 1950, with Sybille Schmitz and Harald Paulsen) - director
 One Night's Intoxication (West Germany 1951, with Christl Mardayn) - director
 Verlorene Melodie (Austria 1952, with Elfie Mayerhofer) - director, screenplay
 Ich hab' mich so an Dich gewöhnt/Geschiedenes Fräulein (Austria 1952, with Inge Egger and O. W. Fischer) - director, screenplay
 Die Wirtin von Maria Wörth (Austria 1952, with Isa and Jutta Günther) - director, screenplay
  (Austria 1953, with Attila Hörbiger) - director, screenplay
  (Austria 1953) - director
 Maxie (Austria 1954, with Cornell Borchers) - director, screenplay
 The Major and the Bulls (West Germany 1955, with Attila Hörbiger and Christiane Hörbiger) - director
 Geliebte Corinna (West Germany 1956, with Elisabeth Müller and Hans Söhnker) - director
 Dany, bitte schreiben Sie (West Germany 1956) - director, screenplay
 Liane, Jungle Goddess (West Germany 1956, with Marion Michael and Hardy Krüger) - director
  (Austria 1958, with Olive Moorefield and Karin Dor) - director
 Der Schäfer vom Trutzberg (West Germany 1959, with Heidi Brühl and Hans von Borsody) - director
 Traumrevue (Austria 1959, with Waltraut Haas and Eva Pawlik) - director
 When the Bells Sound Clearly (Austria 1959, with Willy Birgel) - director, screenplay
 Romance in Venice (Austria 1962, with Willy Birgel and Ann Smyrner) - director, screenplay

References

Sources 
  CineGraph. Lexikon zum deutschsprachigen Film

External links 
 
 Filmportal.de

Austrian cinematographers
Austrian film directors
Austrian film editors
Nobility from Vienna
Hungarian nobility
Austrian people of Hungarian descent
Film people from Vienna
1898 births
1970 deaths
Hungarian cinematographers
Film directors from Vienna